Emerson Hammer (August 12, 1856 – March 6, 1940) was an American politician in the state of Washington. He served in the Washington State Senate from 1901 to 1903.

References

Republican Party Washington (state) state senators
1856 births
1940 deaths
People from Blackford County, Indiana
People from Sedro-Woolley, Washington